Red Astrachan is a Russian or Swedish cultivar of domesticated apple, which is an early season apple, juicy, tart and mealy texture with pleasant flavour, and use for eating, cooking and cider. It is medium-sized, crimson colored. As all the early season apples, it is not good for storage. It is known by several other names including 'Abe Lincoln', 'American Red', and 'Waterloo'.

Growing tips
This cultivar needs rich soil, moderate watering, good drainage, big spacing and full sun. Needs pruning. Susceptical to apple scab, fireblight, frost, apple rust disease, black rot, bitter rot and pests. This plant is attractive to bees, butterflies and birds. Flowers are fragrant.

History
The Red Astrachan as recorded in the 1870s was a dark-red apple; a variant, the Summer King, was "a bright scarlet".

References

Apple cultivars